"Save Me" is a song by Swedish singer Wiktoria. The song was released in Sweden as a digital download on 28 February 2016, and was written by Jens Siverstedt, DYSON, and Jonas Wallin. It is took part in Melodifestivalen 2016, and qualified to the final from the second semi-final. It was placed fourth in the jury voting but second in the televoting, ending fourth after the combination of the votes.

Charts

Weekly charts

Year-end charts

Release history

References

2015 songs
2016 singles
Melodifestivalen songs of 2016
Swedish pop songs
Wiktoria Johansson songs
English-language Swedish songs
Songs written by Lauren Dyson